
Gmina Stryszawa is a rural gmina (administrative district) in Sucha County, Lesser Poland Voivodeship, in southern Poland.

Villages
Gmina Stryszawa contains the villages and settlements of Hucisko, Krzeszów, Kuków, Kurów, Lachowice, Pewelka, Stryszawa and Targoszów.

Neighbouring gminas
Gmina Stryszawa is bordered by the town of Sucha Beskidzka and by the gminas of Andrychów, Jeleśnia, Koszarawa, Maków Podhalański, Ślemień, Zawoja and Zembrzyce.

References
Polish official population figures 2006

Stryszawa
Sucha County